Óscar René Cardozo Marín (born 20 May 1983) is a Paraguayan professional footballer who plays as a striker for Club Libertad and the Paraguay national team.

Known for his powerful left-foot shot and free-kick skills, he first gained attention whilst playing for Newell's Old Boys, which led to a move to Benfica in 2007. He scored nearly 200 official goals for the Portuguese club and won eight major titles, including the 2010 national championship, where he also was the top scorer, and the domestic treble in the 2013–14 season. He then spent two years with Trabzonspor in Turkey before joining Olympiacos.

Nicknamed "Tacuara" (from "Takuára" – Big cane in Guarani), Cardozo gained more than 50 caps for Paraguay, representing the nation at the 2007 Copa América, 2010 FIFA World Cup and 2019 Copa América. In 2006 and 2009, he was named Paraguayan Footballer of the Year.

Early life
Cardozo is the son of Rosa María, who claimed that "Óscar has been a very good son and has managed to help us and take us away from poverty". His father is Arnaldo and his parents have five children.

Club career

Club Atlético 3 de Febrero

2003 season
Cardozo commenced his professional career with modest Club Atlético 3 de Febrero of Ciudad del Este, participating in the División Intermedia championship in 2003 and forming a partner ship with striker Roberto Gamarra. In Round 1 of the 2003 season, Cardozo scored in a 1–1 home draw against Cerro Corá. In the following fixture, he scored in a 2–0 home victory against Sportivo Iteño on 11 May. Two weeks later, he netted in a 3–0 home victory against River Plate Asunción on 25 May. Cardozo would not score again until Round 11, where the player scored the only goal in a 1–0 away victory for 3 de Febrero against Cerro Porteño de Presidente Franco on 13 July. The following week, Cardozo would again score against Cerro Corá in a 1–1 away draw on 27 July.

On 10 August, Cardozo scored his first double in a 2–0 home victory against Nacional Asunción. On 7 May, Cardozo would score the only goal for 3 de Febrero as they were defeated 3–1 away against River Plate Asunción on 16 August. In the following fixture, Cardozo would again score, this time in a 1–1 home draw against Presidente Hayes on 23 August. On 30 August, Cardozo scored in a 5–1 away thrashing against Colegiales, which totaled to five consecutive goals in four matches. Cardozo's last league goal would come in Round 21, when the player netted in a 2–1 away victory against Deportivo Recoleta on 27 September. 3 de Febrero had finished in 2nd place of the División Intermedia table and were drawn into promotion play-off fixtures. On 12 October, Cardozo scored in 3 de Febrero's 4–2 victory against River Plate Asunción and one week later would score against Cerro Corá in his side's 2–0 victory on 19 October. Cardozo again scored in the following play-off fixture, a 3–2 victory against General Caballero Zeballos Cué on 25 October. Having won three qualifying promotion play-off fixtures successfully, 3 de Febrero ultimately faced Club Tacuary in a promotion-relegation play-off, which saw the latter win 4–2 on aggregate.

2004 season
Cardozo scored his first goal of the 2004 División Intermedia season in a 1–0 away victory against Cerro Corá in Round 6 on 2 May, with 3 de Febrero continuing an undefeated run. One week later, Cardozo scored a double against Sportivo San Lorenzo in a 2–0 home victory on 7 May. In the following round, 3 de Febrero suffered their first defeat of the season after 8 eight rounds in a 1–0 away defeat against General Caballero, however, consistent results continued as Cardozo scored in a 1–1 draw in the Superclásico of Alto Paraná against Cerro Porteño PF one week later on 23 May. Cardozo scored his 5th league goal of the season in a 2–1 home victory against Cerro Corá in Round 15 on 9 July. 3 de Febrero had been on a 9-game undefeated streak, which ultimately lasted until Round 18, the last match of the season against Cerro Porteño PF which they narrowly lost 4–3 on 31 July. The match saw Cardozo score his 6th league goal of the season and his final goal as a 3 de Febrero player. Cardozo then joined Nacional Asunción during the 2004 season. Before signing with Nacional Asunción, Cardozo had played in 12 out of 3 de Febrero's 18 league matches, scoring 6 goals, which ultimately saw the club finish in first position of the División Intermedia, with 34 points and having lost just two league matches, and gain promotion to the 2005 Paraguayan Primera División season. Cardozo went on to participate in the second half of the 2004 season for Club Nacional Asunción, participating in the Torneo Clasura.

Club Nacional
In 2004, he moved to the top level with Asunción's Club Nacional, where he quickly established himself as the team's top scorer, scoring 17 overall goals in his last season.

Newell's Old Boys
Cardozo arrived at Argentina and Newell's Old Boys in the second half of the 2006–07 season for a transfer fee of $1.2 million, joining compatriots Diego Gavilán, Santiago Salcedo and Justo Villar. He netted 11 goals in only 16 games in the Apertura, but his team could only finish 18th in the tournament, and 13th overall. As a result of his performances, he was voted the 2006 Paraguayan Footballer of the Year.

S. L. Benfica

On 21 June 2007, Cardozo officially signed for Portuguese club Benfica, after being bought for an approximate €9.1 million for 80% of his playing rights– this made him the second most expensive signing in the club's history, only surpassed by Simão for whom the club paid €13 million in 2001. Cardozo finished his first season with 22 official goals, but Benfica came out empty in silverware. On 22 February 2008, he scored a last-minute goal against 1. FC Nürnberg for the campaign's UEFA Cup (2–2 away draw, 3–2 aggregate win), thereby keeping his promise of surpassing the 20-goal mark.

In 2008–09 Cardozo scored 17 goals, all in the league, including the equalizer against Porto on 30 August 2008. He finished second in the Bola de Prata race, losing only to Nenê of Nacional. In April 2008, Benfica bought out the remaining 20% of his rights for a further €2.5 million, thus investing €11.6 million total in his economic rights.

Cardozo had a very positive 2009–10 pre-season, netting eight times in ten matches. On 31 August 2009, in the third league game, he scored a hat-trick in an 8–1 home demolition of Vitória de Setúbal. On 22 October, in the Europa League group stage match against Everton, Tacuara netted twice in two minutes in a 5–0 thrashing at the Estádio da Luz, and added a further three in the league against Nacional (6–1, at home), and with Académica de Coimbra (4–0, home).

In the Europa League quarter-finals against Liverpool, Cardozo scored two penalties for a 2–1 home win. He also found the net in the second leg at Anfield with a free kick, but in a 1–4 loss and subsequent elimination; as Benfica won the national championship, adding the year's domestic League Cup, he finished with a career-high 38 goals in 47 matches (26 in the domestic league, leading Porto's Radamel Falcao by only one), partnering well with Argentine Javier Saviola. On 10 February 2010, Benfica sold 20% of his economic rights to Benfica Stars Fund for €4 million, valuing him at €20 million.

At the end of the 2011–12 campaign Cardozo was crowned the Primeira Liga's top scorer for the second time, with 20 goals – joint with Braga's Lima – as Benfica finished in second position. On 10 December 2012, he scored three in a 3–1 derby win at Sporting (even though one of the goals was initially attributed to Marcos Rojo as an own goal), repeating the feat the following week at home against Marítimo (4–1), which resulted in him surpassing the 100-goal mark in domestic league play.

On 2 January 2013, Cardozo took his season tally to 21 goals in 19 official games after netting three in a 6–0 home routing of Desportivo das Aves for the campaign's Taça de Portugal. On 2 May, he scored his fifth and sixth in eight contests in the season's Europa League, being crucial to a 3–1 home win against Fenerbahçe in the semi-finals second leg with the subsequent 3–2 aggregate qualification to the final in Amsterdam. In the decisive match, he netted from the penalty spot in the 68th minute for the 1–1 equalizer against Chelsea, who won it 2–1.

Cardozo was replaced after 70 minutes in the domestic cup final on 26 May 2013, with Benfica leading 1–0 but then losing 1–2 to Vitória de Guimarães. At the end of the game, he angrily confronted manager Jorge Jesus, inclusively pushing him; he later apologised for his actions, being fined for half of his monthly salary.

Cardozo started the new season after his teammates due to the controversy, but soon returned to his scoring ways. His goals against Guimarães, Estoril, and Nacional were vital in keeping Benfica in the race for the title. On 9 November 2013, he put three past Sporting in a 4–3 home win for the domestic cup's fourth round, increasing to 13 the goals he scored against Sporting, surpassing Manuel Fernandes in the list of top goalscorers of the Derby de Lisboa. In November 2013, an injury ruled him out for  months. When he returned, he found himself relegated to the bench, with the team now fully adapted to play with Lima and Rodrigo. On 1 February, after missing his ninth penalty kick in Primeira Liga, in a match against Gil Vicente, Cardozo became the player with most missed penalties in the competition.

On 14 May 2014, Cardozo missed a penalty shootout against Sevilla in a Europa League final loss on penalties. He still finished the campaign with 11 goals all competitions comprised, including seven in the domestic league which was won for the 33rd time.

In early August 2014, Trabzonspor announced they were negotiating with Benfica and Cardozo. On 4 August 2014, Cardozo left Benfica and thanked the club by stating, "You will always be in my heart".

Cardozo played for Benfica since 2007 and, together with Maxi Pereira and Luisão, was one of the team captains. He is Benfica's ninth all-time goalscorer, second in European competitions, and the highest-scoring foreigner at the club, with 172 goals.

Trabzonspor

On 4 August 2014, Cardozo moved Turkish Süper Lig side Trabzonspor for a €5 million fee, (Benfica received €4 million, the fund €1 million) with a further €1.65 million contingent on performance-related bonuses. He signed a contract with €2.5 million per season plus bonuses.

On 21 August, he scored his first goal for the club, in a 2–0 home win against Russian side Rostov for the campaign's UEFA Europa League. Cardozo made his league debut in a 1–1 away draw against İstanbul Başakşehir on 22 September. He came onto the field in the 52nd minute for Fatih Atik, and scored a 93rd-minute penalty to equalise.

On 1 December, Cardozo scored his first hat-trick in a 4–1 home victory against Gençlerbirliği. He scored in the 8th, 40th and 65th minutes of the match before being substituted off of the field for Fatih Atik in the 70th minute. Cardozo brought his goal scoring tally to eight goals in nine league appearances. During a group stage match of the 2014–15 Turkish Cup, Cardozo scored a double in Trabzonspor's 9–0 home victory against Manisaspor on 25 December.

Cardozo rounded off the season scoring 17 league goals in 29 appearances as Trabzonspor finished in fifth place and qualified for the 2015–16 UEFA Europa League second qualifying round. He finished in third place of the Süper Lig top goalscorers list, behind Demba Ba (18 goals) and Fernandão (22 goals).

After the 2014–15 season, it was announced that Cardozo would not play in the 2015 Copa América for Paraguay due to a back injury, whereupon it was then revealed by his agent that he had been playing through the pain for his club side.

Olympiacos
On 31 August 2016, Cardozo joined Greek champions Olympiacos. He scored his first goal in the Super League Greece on 12 December that year, opening the score in a 2–0 away win over PAS Giannina and thus ending his seven-match goalless run.

Libertad
On 28 June 2017, Cardozo signed with Libertad in Paraguay. In his first match for the team, Cardozo scored a double in a 5–1 away win over Huracán in the 2017 Copa Sudamericana on 12 July. On 13 February 2019, he scored a half-way line goal, the fourth in a 5–1 home win over Bolivian side The Strongest in the second qualifying stage of the Copa Libertadores.

On 5 November 2019, he scored the opening goal of Libertad's 4–1 away victory over Sol América on the Copa Paraguay semifinals. On 4 December 2019, Libertad won their first Copa Paraguay after beating Guaraní 3–0. Cardozo came on in the 83rd minute of the final.

On 23 May 2021, Libertad secured their twenty-first league title winning the Torneo Apertura.

International career
On 7 October 2006, Cardozo made his international debut for Paraguay in an exhibition game with Australia, and he scored his first goal on 5 June of the following year in another friendly, against Mexico. He was selected for the squad that appeared in that year's Copa América: the tournament in Venezuela ended in the quarter-finals and the player netted once, in a 3–1 group stage win against the United States.

Cardozo scored two goals in the 2010 FIFA World Cup qualification stages, as Paraguay qualified for the finals in South Africa. On 29 June 2010, he netted the winning penalty in the shootout against Japan (5–3 victory), as La Albirroja qualified for the World Cup quarter-finals for the first time ever. In the following game, however, with the score at 0–0, he missed a 59th-minute penalty against Spain in a 0–1 defeat against the eventual champions.

Cardozo was overlooked by coach Gerardo Martino for the 2011 Copa América squad, despite scoring 23 official goals for Benfica in 2010–11. Having already been included by Ramón Díaz in the Albirroja preliminary squad, Cardozo would again miss out 2015 Copa América due to a back injury. On 16 June 2019, aged 36, he scored against Qatar in Copa América and became the oldest player in Paraguay's history to score in that competition, breaking Delfín Benítez Cáceres' 1946 record.

Personal life
In spite of the same surname, a similar nickname and physical resemblance, he is not related to Ramón Cardozo (known as "Tacuarita"), who is also a footballer and a forward. He obtained Portuguese citizenship in November 2014.

Career statistics

Club

International
.

Scores and results list Paraguay's goal tally first.

Honours

Club
3 de Febrero
Paraguayan División Intermedia: 2004

Benfica
Primeira Liga: 2009–10, 2013–14
Taça de Portugal: 2013–14
Taça da Liga: 2008–09, 2009–10, 2010–11, 2011–12, 2013–14
Supertaça Cândido de Oliveira runner-up: 2010
UEFA Europa League runner-up: 2012–13, 2013–14

Olympiacos
Super League Greece: 2016–17

Libertad
Paraguayan Primera División: 2021 Apertura, 2022 Apertura 
Copa Paraguay: 2019

Individual
Paraguayan Footballer of the Year: 2006, 2009
Primeira Liga Top scorer: 2009–10, 2011–12
SJPF Player of the Month: May 2009, 2011–12
Taça de Portugal Top scorer: 2007–08, 2010–11, 2012–13
UEFA Europa League top scorer: 2009–10
Goal.com Team of the Year: 2009–10
Primera División Top scorer: 2018

See also
 Players and Records in Paraguayan Football

References

External links

 
 
 

1983 births
Living people
People from Caaguazú Department
Paraguayan footballers
Association football forwards
Paraguayan Primera División players
Club Nacional footballers
Club Libertad footballers
Argentine Primera División players
Newell's Old Boys footballers
Primeira Liga players
Süper Lig players
Super League Greece players
S.L. Benfica footballers
Trabzonspor footballers
Olympiacos F.C. players
Paraguay international footballers
2010 FIFA World Cup players
Paraguayan expatriate footballers
Expatriate footballers in Argentina
Expatriate footballers in Turkey
Expatriate footballers in Greece
Paraguayan expatriate sportspeople in Argentina
Paraguayan expatriate sportspeople in Turkey
Paraguayan expatriate sportspeople in Greece
2019 Copa América players
Portuguese people of Latin American descent